Ekaterina Dmitrenko (born 16 January 1990) is a Russian footballer who plays as a defender for FC Yenisey Krasnoyarsk.

Honours 
WFC Rossiyanka
Winner
 Russian Women's Football Championship: 2010

Runner-up
 Russian Women's Football Championship: 2015
 Russian Women's Cup (2): 2012, 2013

External links 
 

1990 births
Living people
Russian women's footballers
Russia women's international footballers
WFC Rossiyanka players
FC Zorky Krasnogorsk (women) players
CSP Izmailovo players
Women's association football defenders
Ryazan-VDV players
FC Yenisey Krasnoyarsk players